The Billboard Latin Pop Airplay is a chart that ranks the best-performing Spanish-language Pop music singles of the United States. Published by Billboard magazine, the data are compiled by Nielsen SoundScan based collectively on each single's weekly airplay.

Chart history

References

United States Latin Pop
2012
2012 in Latin music